Thienothiophene usually refers to any of three structurally related derivatives of thiophene with the formula C6H4S2.  In order of importance, they are: thieno(3,2-b)thiophene, thieno(2,3-b)thiophene, and thieno(3,4-b)thiophene.  Other isomers feature S(IV) and are less stable.  Thieno[2,3-b]thiophene was the first member of the series to be isolated.  It was obtained in very low yield upon heating citric acid, a source of a six-carbon linear chain, with P4S10.  More efficient syntheses of this and the other two stable thienothiophenes involve cyclization reactions of substituted thiophenes. 

Three thienothiophenes, being aromatic and bicyclic, are often compared with naphthalene. They are the topic of academic research.  They have no commercial applications nor are they or their derivatives found naturally.

References

Sulfur heterocycles
Heterocyclic compounds with 2 rings